Nualik was a settlement in eastern Greenland.

History
During the 1898-1900 Carlsberg Fund Expedition to East Greenland, Georg Carl Amdrup landed at Nualik where he found a dwelling with the bodies of 38 dead Inuit.

References 

Former populated places in Greenland